A by-election was held for the New South Wales Legislative Assembly electorate of Braidwood on 3 February 1864 because of the death of Merion Moriarty.

Dates

Results

Merion Moriarty died.

See also
Electoral results for the district of Braidwood
List of New South Wales state by-elections

References

1864 elections in Australia
New South Wales state by-elections
1860s in New South Wales